Julien Falk (1902-1987) was a 20th-century French composer and composition teacher at the Conservatoire de Paris, and wrote many theorical music books.

He had many students including well known composers Serge Gainsbourg, Gabriel Yared, Michel Coeuriot, Michel Colombier, Pierre Yves Lenik, Eric Demarsan,  Richard Galliano, Robbi Finkel, Philippe Blay and Alain Goraguer.

Compositions 
20 études atonales
Bourrée for piano and violon
Évocation for piano and clarinet
Quatuors composed for saxophones quartet: Marcel Mule
Quintette for 5 trompets
Souvenir for piano and violon
Valse tristounette for piano and violon
Three Symphonies

Initiated in 1933 into the "Grand Orient de France", he also wrote many musical pieces for masonic ceremonies.

Music textbooks 
Technique complète et progressive de l'harmonie en 3 volumes (1969)
Technique du Contrepoint
Technique de la Musique Atonale
Précis technique de composition musicale

References 

French male composers
Academic staff of the Conservatoire de Paris
1902 births
1987 deaths
Musicians from Paris
French people of Russian descent
20th-century French composers
20th-century French male musicians